Why Pick on Me? can refer to:

 Why Pick on Me? (1918 film), a 1918 American film
 Why Pick on Me? (1937 film), a 1937 British film